Roxbury station is a disused train station on the former Ulster and Delaware Railroad / West Shore "Catskill Mountain Branch" in the hamlet of Roxbury, New York. The station is a contributing property to the Ulster and Delaware Railroad Depot and Mill Complex, a historic district on the National Register of Historic Places.

History
This depot was originally constructed by the Rondout & Oswego Railroad with construction completed in January 1872. The R&O would be reorganized into the New York, Kingston and Syracuse railroad only three months later, in April 1872.

The NYK&S RR itself only lasted until 1875, at which time it was reorganized into the Ulster & Delaware Railroad.

The station as originally built consisted of a single rectangular structure, with an internal dividing wall separating passenger and freight rooms.

It was substantially altered sometime between 1888 and 1891 by the U&D.  Some believe Helen Gould Shepherd (railroad tycoon Jay Gould's daughter) designed and/or financed the renovation.

Local history has it, she wanted a more elaborate waiting room for her friends and family, so an addition was constructed on the north side of the building. The addition consisted of two rooms: the tickets agents office (facing the tracks through a bay window) also containing a telegrapher's office, and the main waiting room.

Also of particular note, is that this station was equipped with what is believed to be the first indoor flush toilet in Delaware County, and central heating, with a common coal fired furnace in the basement with duct work and registers to transport hot air to the Ticket Agent's Office & Waiting Room upstairs. This "modern convenience" eliminated the ever-popular "potbelly" stove ever so present and common in railroad stations across the country.

Another addition to the station at this time was a portico, or colonnade (open air roofed area similar to a pole barn) attached to the north side. Most U&D RR stations did not have this feature.

Roxbury, although not as busy as Halcottsville, did have several business located there, including a retail coal dealer, feed and grain supplier, and a paint factory as well as several local creameries.

Although passenger service ended in 1954, the station agent stayed on until 1957.  After that date, it was subsequently used in two commercial ventures, first by a feed & grain dealer from 1959-1976 (when freight service ended this same year); and then by a body shop owner, in the mid-1990s.  Although the entire station was covered with metal siding by the feed supplier, little was changed on the inside, making it one of the best preserved U&D stations.

Roxbury Depot Museum
Today the Roxbury Station proudly houses a multitude of interpretive display kiosks showing local history and interaction with local businesses, as well as maps and diagrams illustrating the history of the U&D RR, and scale dioramas of the station in various eras.
 
The structure itself, is in remarkably good shape (being protected by the sheet metal curtain wall); and the station is being restored by the Ulster and Delaware Railroad Historical Society, which other than the Roxbury Station restoration, has undertaken the restoration of a 1920 H. K. Porter, Inc Steam Locomotive; former BEDT 14; and a 1906 New York, Ontario & Western 4 wheel "Bobber" Caboose #8206].

See also
Ulster and Delaware Railroad Depot and Mill Complex

References

External links
 Roxbury, NY: Ulster and Delaware Rail Depot, with photos
 Ulster & Delaware Railroad Historical Society
 Delaware, Ulster & Greene County RR Memorabilia
 East River Terminal / Brooklyn Eastern District Terminal - History of Operations 1875 - 1983
 Delaware & Ulster Railroad
 Online Guide to the Catskill Mountains
 The Catskill Archive - history of the Catskill Mtns.

Railway stations in the Catskill Mountains
Former Ulster and Delaware Railroad stations
Railroad museums in New York (state)
Museums in Delaware County, New York
Railway stations on the National Register of Historic Places in New York (state)
Railway stations in the United States opened in 1872
Historic district contributing properties in New York (state)
National Register of Historic Places in Delaware County, New York
Railway stations in Delaware County, New York
Former railway stations in New York (state)
Railway stations closed in 1954